Nancy Honeytree (born April 11, 1952) is an American Christian musician and one of the leaders in what was known as Jesus music.

Background 

Born Nancy Henigbaum ("Honeytree" being a translation of her family's German name) was born into a family of professional classical musicians. As a teen, Nancy Honeytree was drawn toward the hippie kids at her school, University of Iowa High School, eventually drifting into the drug culture. In 1970 she met some Jesus People at her sister's art school, and became one herself. After graduating, she worked at a youth ministry in Fort Wayne, Indiana called "The Adam's Apple", a part of the Jesus movement, and it was during these years that she began to write songs about her new-found faith, recording her self-titled first album in 1973.

Billed simply as "Honeytree" most of her career, the singer's folk rock-soprano style was influenced by mainstream artists such as Joni Mitchell, Carole King and Judy Collins, but her lyrics were largely dealing with one's personal relationship with Jesus Christ.

She continued recording throughout the 1970s and toured as a solo artist and with some of the best-known names of the Jesus Movement, such as Phil Keaggy, Mike Johnson, and Mike Warnke. Her third album, Evergreen, is often considered among her best. As her career progressed, Honeytree's style shifted to a classical/bluegrass mix. On October 30, 1983, Honeytree was formally ordained by her church, Calvary Temple, in Fort Wayne. During the 1980s she developed a ministry to single adults, a focus she maintains to this day.

Marriage 

In June 1990, Honeytree married John Richard Miller, also an ordained minister. In 1995 the couple gave birth to their first child; however, he died less than three hours after birth. After the loss, a song, "Up to Something Good", became a song of her faith. Three months later, the Millers were able to adopt another child. John Richard Miller died May 15, 2018 of heart disease.

Discography 

 Honeytree: The First Album 1973, Myrrh Records
 The Way I Feel 1974, Myrrh Records
 Evergreen 1975, Myrrh Records
 Me & My Old Guitar (live) 1977, Myrrh Records
 Melodies In Me 1978, Myrrh Records
 Maranatha Marathon 1979, Myrrh Records
 Merry Christmas, Love Honeytree 1981, Sparrow Records
 Best of Growing Up 1981, Myrrh Records
 Single Heart 1985, Benson Music
 Every Single Day 1987, Milk & Honey Records
 Best of Honeytree Classics. 1989, Milk & Honey Records.
 Resurrection Sunday 1991, Milk & Honey Records
 Pioneer (20th Anniversary Recording) 1993, OakTable Publishing, Inc.
 Dios Ha Abierto la Puerta 1994, OakTable Publishing, Inc.
 Change You Made in Me. 2000, OakTable Publishing, Inc.

References

External links 
 

1952 births
Living people
American performers of Christian music
Jesus movement
Musicians from Fort Wayne, Indiana
Myrrh Records artists